Jan Węglarz (born 1947 in Poznań) is a Polish computer scientist. His current research focuses on operations research.

He studied at the University of Adam Mickiewicz in Poznań, where he graduated mathematics in 1969, and later on Poznań University of Technology, when he received title from automatics in 1971. He started work there in 1971. He received a doctorate in  1974, and habilitation in 1977. In 1988 he received the title of professor. Member of Polish Academy of Sciences (Polska Akademia Nauk, PAN), member-co-founder of Polish Information Processing Society ("Polskie Towarzystwo Informatyczne", PTI), member of American Mathematical Society, Operations Research Society of America, member of Poznan Chapter of Agder Academy of Sciences and Letters. Author of 12 monographs in Computer Science, Operation Research, Decision Theory, etc. Author of more than 200 articles. He discovered the so-called two-phase method,  but since he published his discovery in a Polish journal, the discovery was largely overlooked abroad. He refused many offers to move to the West and opted for his own research team in Poland.

He participated in the development of Elwro Polish computers.

In 1991, he was awarded the EURO Gold Medal, the highest distinction within Operations Research in Europe. In 2018 he received the EURO Distinguished Service Award. He was awarded the decorations of  Knight's Cross (1991), Officer (1997) and Commander (2004) in the Order of Polonia Restituta.

Between 1997-1998 he was President of Association of European Operational Research Societies.

He received honorary degrees from several Polish institutions: 
Szczecin University of Technology (Politechnika Szczecińska) (December 10, 2001), AGH University of Science and Technology (October 16, 2002), Częstochowa University of Technology (Politechnika Częstochowska) (April 22, 2005), Poznań University of Technology (January 14, 2006),  Gdańsk University of Technology (Politechnika Gdańska) (April 16, 2008),    University of Silesia (Uniwersytet Śląski) (July 2, 2008), University of Zielona Góra (June 5, 2009).

References

1947 births
Living people
Polish computer scientists
Academic staff of the Poznań University of Technology
Members of the Polish Academy of Sciences
Poznań University of Technology alumni